Ilse Pagé (29 May 1939 – 19 June 2017) was a German film and television actress.

Selected filmography
 Berlin, Schoenhauser Corner (1957)
 Black Gravel (1961)
  (1961)
 The House in Montevideo (1963)
  (1966)
  The Hunchback of Soho (1966)
 Forty Eight Hours to Acapulco (1967)
 The Monk with the Whip (1967)
 Creature with the Blue Hand (1967)
 Im Banne des Unheimlichen (1968)
 The Gorilla of Soho (1968)
 The Hound of Blackwood Castle (1968)
 Up the Establishment (1969)
 The Man with the Glass Eye (1969)
 The Tin Drum (1979)
 Angels of Iron (1981)
  (1982)

References

External links

1939 births
2017 deaths
German film actresses
German television actresses
Actresses from Berlin
20th-century German actresses
Best Actress German Film Award winners